Heroiv Dnipra ( literally: Heroes of the Dnieper) is a station on Kyiv Metro's Obolonsko–Teremkivska line. The station was opened on 6 November 1982 in the Obolonskyi Raion of Kyiv and was designed by G.D. Andreev. The Metro station is named after the street directly above it.

The station is closer to the surface than a lot of other Metro stations. The platform has a central hall with brown square columns. The walls are adorned with white and yellow marble, and the floor is red granite. There are socialist red stars (due to be removed due to 2015 decommunization laws) at the top of the columns, which is also where the station's lighting comes from. The station is accessible by two passenger tunnels; one leading to Obolonskyi Prospect and the other to Heroiv Dnipra Street (from which it takes its name).

Voters chose to rename the station Heroiv Ukrayiny  (Heroes of Ukraine) - another choice was Heroiv Mariupolya - in a poll taken during the 2022 Russian invasion of Ukraine.

References

External links
 Kyivsky Metropoliten — Station description and photographs 
 Metropoliten.kiev.ua — Station description and photographs 

Kyiv Metro stations
Railway stations opened in 1982
1982 establishments in the Soviet Union
1982 establishments in Ukraine